Castulo doubledayi is a moth of the subfamily Arctiinae first described by Edward Newman in 1857. It is found in the Australian states of Victoria and Tasmania.

References

Moths described in 1857
Lithosiini
Taxa named by Edward Newman